Westland Boroughs was a parliamentary electorate in the West Coast of New Zealand from 1866 to 1870.

Population centres
Westland Boroughs was made up of the areas covered by the boroughs of Greymouth and Hokitika. The enabling legislation allowed for further boroughs to be added as needed, but this did not happen.

History
The Westland Representation Act 1867 introduced changes to the Waimea and Westland electorates. Their areas were reassigned and four electorates formed. Waimea lost some area, but continued to exist as a landlocked electorate. Westland was abolished in 1867. A new electorate (Westland Boroughs) was established, and the Act stipulated that the sitting member (William Sefton Moorhouse) was transferred to it. Other new electorates, for which by-elections were to be held, were Westland North and Westland South.

Hence, Moorhouse was the first representative, and he had been elected for the Westland electorate in the 1866 general election. Moorhouse resigned on 20 February 1868, and William Henry Harrison won the resulting by-election. Harrison served until the end of the term in 1870, when the electorate was abolished.

Members of Parliament
Westland Boroughs was represented by two Members of Parliament:

Election results

1868 by-election

Notes

References

Historical electorates of New Zealand
Politics of the West Coast, New Zealand